His Back Against the Wall is a 1922 American comedy film directed by Rowland V. Lee and written by Julien Josephson. The film stars Raymond Hatton, Virginia Valli, Will Walling, J. Gordon Russell, W.H. Bainbridge and Virginia Madison. The film was released on May 21, 1922, by Goldwyn Pictures.

Cast       
Raymond Hatton as Jeremy Dice
Virginia Valli as Mary Welling
Will Walling as Sheriff Lawrence
J. Gordon Russell as Bronc Lewis
W.H. Bainbridge as Henry Welling
Virginia Madison as Mrs. Welling
Fred Kohler as Arizona Pete
Jack Curtis as Lew Shaler
Dudley Hendricks as Dr. Farley
Shannon Day as Dorothy Petwell
Raymond Cannon as Jimmy Boyle
Louis Morrison as Foutch

Preservation status
The film survives in the MGM Library.

References

External links

1922 films
1920s English-language films
Silent American comedy films
Goldwyn Pictures films
Films directed by Rowland V. Lee
American silent feature films
American black-and-white films
1922 comedy films
1920s American films